South View is a summer village in Alberta, Canada. It is located on the northern shore of Isle Lake, opposite from Silver Sands.

Demographics 

In the 2016 Census of Population conducted by Statistics Canada, the Summer Village of South View had a population of 67 living in 30 of its 88 total private dwellings, a  change from its 2011 population of 35.

The Summer Village of South View's 2012 municipal census counted a population of 76.

See also 
List of communities in Alberta
List of summer villages in Alberta
List of resort villages in Saskatchewan

References

External links 

1970 establishments in Alberta
Lac Ste. Anne County
Summer villages in Alberta